Floraville may refer to:

Floraville, Illinois
Floraville, New South Wales
Floraville Historic District, Lebanon, Ohio